Alfred Uhl (5 June 1909 – 8 June 1992) was an Austrian composer, violist, music teacher and conductor.

Biography
Uhl was born in Vienna and studied with Franz Schmidt at the Vienna Music Academy, receiving a diploma in composition with honours in 1932. He subsequently worked as Kapellmeister of the Swiss Festspielmusik in Zürich. While there he composed scores for a variety of cultural and industrial films. He returned to Vienna in 1938 and in 1940 was drafted into the Austrian Army. From 1940 to 1942 he commanded a French prison camp in Neumarkt. He joined the faculty of the Vienna Music Academy in 1945, where he taught theory, orchestration and composition until his retirement in 1980. One of his notable students was Alfred Prinz. He was the recipient of the Vienna Schubert Prize (1943), the Austrian State Prize (1960), the Vienna Music Prize (1961), the Viennese Gold Medal of Honour (1969) and the Austrian Badge of Honour for Service and Arts (1980). He also served as the president of the Austrian Gesellschaft der Autoren, Komponisten und Musikverleger (1970) and the Künstler-Union (1976).

As a composer, Uhl synthesized elements from neo-classicism, atonality, serialism and traditional tonal and contrapuntal idioms. His vibrant style combined technical sophistication and musical charm with wit and humour, rhythmic inventiveness, thematic development and advanced harmonic language. He wrote eight film scores, one opera, several choral works, and multiple symphonic and chamber music pieces. He wrote extensively for the clarinet, including educational material and works that are still common repertoire. His most famous educational pieces are the two volumes which comprise 48 Studies. His Divertimento for Three Clarinets and Bass Clarinet is one of the most performed works for the medium. Written in 1942 for clarinettists from the Vienna Philharmonic, it is a demanding three-movement work structured similarly to a conventional concerto.

48 Studies for clarinet 

Two volumes of 24 studies each, first published in 1940 by Schott Music, were designed to familiarise the advancing clarinettist with some of the more difficult possibilities being written in modern instrumental music. This is stated by Uhl himself in a foreword to some, but not all editions. As such, they occasionally include intervals which require sliding over keys on the French system of clarinet, a technique that is generally frowned upon unless, as in these cases, it cannot be avoided.

The studies are characterized by their extensive use of neo-romantic chromaticism and rhythmic complexity. Occasionally viewed as less musical and more technical than most studies, some clarinetists consider it a second goal to bring out the musicality of each piece, which may be hidden behind technical complexities.

Uhl was assisted by Leopold Wlach of the Vienna Philharmonic Orchestra, who made suggestions and revisions throughout the writing process.

Selected works

Stage
 Rondeau, Tänzerische Variationen nach Themen von Molière, Ballet (1949)
 Katzenmusik, Ballet-Opera in 3 scenes (1959); libretto by Karl Friedrich Alys
 Der mysteriöse Herr X, Opera in a prelude and 3 acts (1962–1965); libretto by Theo Lingen

Orchestra
 Präludium (1929)
 Lobgesang der Arbeit, Symphonic Suite (1938)
 Wiener Walzer (1939)
Musik der Arbeit for small orchestra (1939)
 7 Miniatures for chamber orchestra (1944)
 4 Capricen von Musikanten, fahrenden Sängern, Gauklern und Komödianten (1944–1945)
 Sonate für Orchester (1945)
 Introduktion und Variationen über eine Melodie aus dem 16. Jahrhundert ("Es geht eine dunkle Wolk' herein ...") for string orchestra (1947)
 Concerto a ballo (1966)
 Sinfonietta (1977)
 Drei  Skizzen (3 Sketches) (1979–1980)
 Concerto for chamber orchestra (1984)

Concertante
 Konzertante Sinfonie for clarinet and orchestra (1943); or for bassoon and orchestra (1987)
 Concertino for violin and 22 wind instruments (1949, revised 1986)
 Kleines Konzert for violin and orchestra (1963)

Chamber and instrumental music
 Andante for cello and organ (1923)
 Andante for violin, cello and organ (or piano) (1923)
 Stimmungsbild for viola and piano (1923)
 String Trio (1923)
 10 Divertimenti for viola and cello (1924)
 Sarabande for violin and piano (1924)
 Widmung (Dedication) for cello and piano (1924)
 Norwegisches Küstenlied for violin, cello and piano (or organ) (1926)
 Kleine Suite for violin, viola and guitar (1926–1930)
 Piano Quartet in B minor (1927)
 Trio for violin, viola and guitar (1928, 1982)
 Wiener Weisen for violin, viola and guitar (1929)
 Septet for clarinet, 3 violins, 2 violas and cello (1930)
 Sonatina for cello and piano (1931)
 Kleine Burleske for string quartet (1932)
 Rondo for 2 violins (1935)
 Kleines Konzert (Little Concerto) for clarinet, viola and piano (1937, revised 1988); also for violin, cello and piano (1972), or clarinet, alto saxophone and piano (1988)
 Sonata for guitar (1937)
 10 kleine Stücke for guitar (1937–1939)
 48 Etüden for clarinet solo (1938)
 Spielmusik for mandoline, violin, viola and cello (1938)
 5 frohe Weisen für den Wr. Weihnachtsmarkt for 3 oboes, 2 clarinets, 2 bassoons and 2 horns (1939)
 Divertimento for 3 clarinets and bass clarinet (1942)
 Eine vergnügliche Musik for 8 wind instruments (1944)
 String Quartet No. 1 (1945–1946, 1969)
 String Quartet No. 2 "Jubiläumsquartett" (1961)
 4 Tanzstücke for string quartet, clarinet, bassoon and horn (1963–1964)
 Humoreske for wind quintet (1965)
 Eine vergnügliche Spielmusik for 3 violins and cello (1969)
 Sonata classica for guitar (1969)
 15 Etüden for bassoon solo (1970)
 20 Etüden (intermediate to difficult) for viola solo (1971)
 30 Etüden (easy to intermediate) for viola solo (1972)
 Kleine Suite (from 20 Etüden) for viola solo (1973)
 Drei Stücke (3 Pieces) for flute and guitar (1982)
 Drei Tanzstücke (3 Dance Pieces) for wind octet (1985–1986)
 Commedia musicale for clarinet, viola and piano (1982); also for 2 pianos (1987)
 Scherzo Capriccioso for bassoon (or bass clarinet) and piano (1986); also for wind octet (1989)
 Vier Stücke (4 Pieces) for wind quintet (1990–1991)
 Konzert for bassoon and string quartet (1991–1992); original version: Kleines Konzert for clarinet, viola and piano (1937)

Piano
 Wiener Weisen (1922)
 Musik zu einem Lustspiel (1925)
 2. Tanzsuite (Dance Suite No. 2) (1927)
 4 kleine Stücke (1974)
 Drosser Musettewalzer (1979)
 Commedia musicale for 2 pianos (1982, 1987); original version for clarinet, viola and piano

Vocal
 Vergänglichkeit for alto (mezzo-soprano) and piano (1922); words by J. M. Wunderlich
 Marienlied for soprano and chamber ensemble (1924); words by J. M. Wunderlich
 Abendlandschaft for soprano and piano (1924); words by Joseph von Eichendorff
 Mittagsruh for soprano and piano (1924); words by Joseph von Eichendorff
 Die Sperlinge for mezzo-soprano and piano (1924); words by Joseph von Eichendorff
 Bitte for voice and piano (1925); words by Nikolaus Lenau
 Frische Fahrt for voice and piano (1925); words by Joseph von Eichendorff
 Gleichheit for soprano and piano (1925); words by Joseph von Eichendorff
 Wegweiser for soprano and piano (1925); words by Joseph von Eichendorff
 Im Walde for mezzo-soprano and piano (1926); words by Joseph von Eichendorff
 Lieblingsplätzchen for voice and piano (1926); words from Des Knaben Wunderhorn
 Abschied for mezzo-soprano and piano (1927); words by Joseph von Eichendorff
 Buße for baritone and piano (1928)
 Herbstweh for mezzo-soprano and piano (1929); words by Joseph von Eichendorff
 Die Schnupftabaksdose for voice and piano (1935); words by Joachim Ringelnatz
 Sehnsucht zurück for voice and piano (1935); words by Herbert Strutz
 Mir ist ein schön's braun Maidelein for voice, violin, viola and cello (1946)
 So ruhig geh ich meinen Pfad for voice and piano (1952); words by Joseph von Eichendorff
 4 Lieder aus der Heiteren Kantate "Wer Einsam ist, der Hat es Gut" for soprano, viola and piano (1984)

Choral
 Messe in h-Moll (Mass in B minor) for soloists, chorus, orchestra and organ (1926–1927)
 Gilgamesch, Oratorical Music Drama for soloists, narrator, mixed chorus, children's chorus, orchestra and organ (1954–1955, revised 1967–1968)
 Wer einsam ist, der hat es gut, Cantata for soloists, mixed chorus and orchestra (1960, revised 1963); after poems of Wilhelm Busch, Christian Morgenstern and Joachim Ringelnatz
 Die Zeit for male chorus and piano (1963); words by Christian Morgenstern
 Drei Bagatellen (3 Bagatelles) for mixed chorus a cappella (1970) 
 Bumerang for male chorus a cappella (1970); words by Joachim Ringelnatz
 Tierischer Ernst for mixed chorus a cappella (1971); words by Heinrich Gattermeyer
 So ruhig geh' ich meinen Pfad for mixed chorus a cappella (1971)

Film scores

Honours and awards
 State Prize for Music (1953)
 Grand Austrian State Prize for music (along with Theodor Berger) (1959)
 City of Vienna Prize for music (1961)
 Honorary Medal of the capital Vienna in gold (1969)
 President of the AKM (Society of Authors, Composers and Publishers, 1970–75)
 Austrian Cross of Honour for Science and Art, 1st class (1980)

Sources
J.M. Hinson. The New Grove Dictionary of Opera, edited by Stanley Sadie (1992).  and

References

External links
 Alfred Uhl at Music Information Centre Austria

1909 births
1992 deaths
Musicians from Vienna
Austrian opera composers
Male opera composers
Austrian classical composers
Austrian classical violists
Male conductors (music)
Recipients of the Austrian State Prize
Recipients of the Grand Austrian State Prize
Recipients of the Austrian Cross of Honour for Science and Art, 1st class
20th-century Austrian conductors (music)
20th-century Austrian male musicians
20th-century classical composers
Austrian male classical composers
20th-century violists